is a Japanese animation studio founded in 2013 and based in Nishitōkyō, Tokyo.

On February 10, 2020, it was announced that Millepensee had formed a partnership with Sanzigen to form 3DCG animation studio IXIXI.

Establishment
The studio was founded in 2013 by producer Naoko Shiraishi. Since its founding, all of Millepensee's works have been directed by ex-Madhouse director and producer Shin Itagaki (with the exception of the Wake Up, Girls! films).

Works

Television series

OVA/ONAs

Films

Music videos

See also
Shaft—Millepensee founder Naoko Shiraishi worked for Shaft before transferring to Gainax around 2002
Gainax—Shiraishi worked for Gainax until 2012, and founded Millepensee the year later

References

External links
Millepensee Official Website 

Japanese animation studios
Japanese companies established in 2013
Animation studios in Tokyo
Mass media companies established in 2013
Nishitōkyō, Tokyo